Eklavya University is a Private University located in Damoh, Madhya Pradesh, India

References

Universities in Madhya Pradesh
Private universities in India
2020 establishments in Madhya Pradesh
Educational institutions established in 2020